The Grand Buddha is located on the north shore of Lake Tai, near Wuxi, Jiangsu. It is one of the largest Buddha statues in China and also in the world.

It was completed at the end of 1996.

In 2008, a Five-signets Palace and a Hindu inspired Brahma Palace were built south-east of the Grand Buddha Statue.

Gallery

See also
List of tallest statues

External links

Travel guide in Jiangsu and other provinces

References

Colossal Buddha statues
Bronze Buddha statues
Tourist attractions in Jiangsu
Buddhist temples in Wuxi
20th-century Buddhism